Prague Castle is a castle complex in Prague 1 within Prague, Czech Republic, built in the 9th century. It is the official office of the President of the Czech Republic. The castle was a seat of power for kings of Bohemia, Holy Roman emperors, and presidents of Czechoslovakia. The Bohemian Crown Jewels are kept within a hidden room inside it.

The castle is among the most visited tourist attractions in Prague, attracting over 1.8  million visitors annually.

History

Přemyslid fort
The history of the castle began in 870 when its first walled building, the Church of the Virgin Mary, was built. The Basilica of Saint George and the Basilica of St. Vitus were founded under the reign of Vratislaus I, Duke of Bohemia and his son St. Wenceslaus in the first half of the 10th century.

The first convent in Bohemia was founded in the castle, next to the church of St. George. A Romanesque palace was erected here during the 12th century.

Several 13th-century Venetian coins found there were studied by the numismatist Zdenka Nemeškalová-Jiroudková.

Medieval castle
King Ottokar II of Bohemia improved fortifications and rebuilt the royal palace for the purposes of representation and housing. In the 14th century, under the reign of Charles IV the royal palace was rebuilt in Gothic style and the castle fortifications were strengthened. In place of the rotunda and basilica of St. Vitus, building began of a vast Gothic church, that were completed almost six centuries later.

During the Hussite Wars and the following decades, the castle was not inhabited. In 1485, King Vladislaus II Jagiellon began to rebuild the castle. The massive Vladislav Hall (built by Benedikt Rejt) was added to the Royal Palace. New defence towers were also built on the north side of the castle.

A large fire in 1541 destroyed large parts of the castle. Under the Habsburgs, some new buildings in Renaissance style were added. Ferdinand I built the Belvedere as a summer palace for his wife Anne. Rudolph II used Prague Castle as his main residence. He founded the northern wing of the palace, with the Spanish Hall, where his precious art collections were exhibited.

The Third Defenestration of Prague in 1618 took place at the castle which kick-started the Bohemian Revolt. During the subsequent wars, the castle was damaged and dilapidated. Many works from the collection of Rudolph II were looted by Swedes in 1648 during the Battle of Prague (1648) which was the final act of the Thirty Years' War.

The last major rebuilding of the castle was carried out by Empress Maria Theresa in the second half of the 18th century. Following the abdication of Ferdinand I, in 1848, and the succession of his nephew, Franz Joseph, to the throne, the former emperor, Ferdinand I, made Prague Castle his home.

Presidential residence

In 1918, the castle became the seat of the president of the new Czechoslovak Republic, Tomáš Masaryk. The New Royal Palace and the gardens were renovated by Slovenian architect Jože Plečnik. In this period the St. Vitus Cathedral was finished on September 28, 1929. Renovations continued in 1936 under Plečnik's successor Pavel Janák.

On March 15, 1939, shortly after Nazi Germany forced Czech President Emil Hácha (who suffered a heart attack during the negotiations) to hand his nation over to the Germans, Adolf Hitler spent a night in the Prague Castle, "proudly surveying his new possession." During the Nazi occupation of Czechoslovakia in World War II, Prague Castle became the headquarters of Reinhard Heydrich, the Reich Protector of Bohemia and Moravia. According to a popular rumor, he is said to have placed the Bohemian crown on his head; old legends say a usurper who places the crown on his head is doomed to die within a year. Less than a year after assuming power, on May 27, 1942, Heydrich was ambushed during Operation Anthropoid, by British-trained Slovak and Czech resistance soldiers while on his way to the Castle, and died of his wounds, which became infected, a week later. Klaus, his firstborn son, died the next year in a traffic accident, also in line with the legend.

After the liberation of Czechoslovakia and the coup in 1948, the Castle housed the offices of the communist Czechoslovak government. After Czechoslovakia split in 1993 into the Czech Republic and Slovakia, the castle became the seat of the Head of State of the new Czech Republic. Similar to what Masaryk did with Plečnik, president Václav Havel commissioned Bořek Šípek to be the architect of post-communist improvements for Prague Castle, in particular of the facelift of the castle's gallery of paintings.

Architectural styles of Prague Castle

The castle buildings represent many of the architectural styles of the last millennium. Prague Castle includes Gothic St. Vitus Cathedral, Romanesque Basilica of St. George, a monastery and several palaces, gardens and defense towers. Most of the castle areas are open to tourists. The castle houses several museums, including the National Gallery collection of Bohemian baroque and mannerist art, exhibition  dedicated to Czech history, Toy Museum and the picture gallery of Prague Castle, based on the collection of Rudolph II. The Summer Shakespeare Festival regularly takes place in the courtyard of Burgrave Palace.

The neighborhood around Prague Castle is called Hradčany.

Churches

 Katedrála svatého Víta, Václava a Vojtěcha (St. Vitus Cathedral)
 Bazilika svatého Jiří (St. George's Basilica, Prague) and Klášter svatého Jiří (St. George's Convent, Prague), it is the oldest surviving church building within Prague Castle.
 Chrám Všech svatých (All Saints Church)
 Kaple svatého Kříže

Palaces
 Starý královský palác (Old Royal Palace)
 Letohrádek královny Anny (Queen Anne's Summer Palace, better known as the Belvedere)
 Lobkovický palác (Lobkowicz Palace, not to be confused with the German embassy in Malá Strana)
 Nový královský palác

Halls 
 Sloupová síň
 Španělský sál (Spanish Hall)
 Rudolfova galerie (Rudolph's Gallery)
 Rothmayerův sál (Rothmayer's Hall)
 Vladislavský sál (Vladislav Hall)

Towers
 Bílá věž
 Černá věž
 Daliborka
 Prašná věž or Mihulka

Other buildings
 Zlatá ulička (Golden Lane)
 Staré purkrabství
 Míčovna 
 Jízdárna Pražského hradu
 Staré proboštství
 Nové proboštství
 Obrazárna Pražského hradu
 Konírna Pražského hradu (stable)
 Prašný most

Gardens

 Královská zahrada (Royal Garden of Prague Castle)
 Oranžérie (Orangery)  
 Zahrada na terase Jízdárny 
 Zahrada Na Baště (The Garden on the Bastion) 
 Jižní zahrady (South Gardens)
 Rajská zahrada
 Zahrada Na Valech 
 Hartigovská zahrada
 Jelení příkop (Deer Moat)
 Svatováclavská vinice
 Produkční zahrady Pražského hradu

Structures
 Kohlova kašna (Kohl's Fountain)
 Matyášova brána (Matthias Gate)
 Obelisk  (Obelisk)
 Socha svatého Jiří (Statue of Saint George)

See also
 History of early modern period domes
 Prague Castle skeleton

References

Sources

 Fischer, Klaus. Nazi Germany: A New History. New York: Continuum, 1995.
 Reitlinger, Gerald. The SS: Alibi of a Nation, 1922-1945. New York: Da Capo Press, 1989.

External links 
 Virtual visit with map and written commentary (in Czech)
 Virtual visit with map and written commentary (in English)
 Tourist information – Official tourist website
 Prague Castle – Official website
 History of Prague Castle

 
Presidential residences
Jože Plečnik buildings
National Cultural Monuments of the Czech Republic
Castles in the Czech Republic
Tourist attractions in Prague